The A3 Autoroute is a French autoroute located entirely within the départment of Seine-Saint-Denis, serving Montreuil-sous-Bois, Rosny-sous-Bois, and Bondy. Its southern terminus is an interchange with the Boulevard Périphérique at the Porte de Bagnolet, and its northern terminus is an interchange with the A1 near Le Bourget Airport. The A3 is 15 km long, and forms a part of European Route E15. A brief segment of its length is a concurrency with the A86. The first section of the roadway opened in 1969 between the Porte de Bagnolet and Bondy. Following the closure of the A186, one spur route branches off from the A3 - the A103 Autoroute.

The A186 Autoroute was originally planned to connect the A3 with the A86 - however this spur was never completed. It closed in May 2019, and will be converted into an extension of Île-de-France tramway Line 1 by 2024.

Lists of Exits and Junctions

European Routes

References 

A03